Zombieland: Double Tap – Road Trip is a shoot 'em up video game developed by High Voltage Software and published by GameMill Entertainment in North America and Maximum Games in Europe. It is based on the Zombieland film series, and was released on October 15, 2019 for Microsoft Windows, Nintendo Switch, PlayStation 4, and Xbox One, three days before Zombieland: Double Taps US release.

Plot 
The story is set between the events of Zombieland and Zombieland: Double Tap.

Gameplay 
The gameplay utilizes a top-down isometric view similar to Contra: Rogue Corps. The gameplay modes are campaign and horde modes which can be played in single-player or multiplayer cooperative (with up to four players). It is based on player versus environment (PvE) gameplay, with dual analog sticks (analog stick and directional pad in optional horizontal Joy-Con gameplay for the Switch version).

As Columbus, Tallahassee, Little Rock, Wichita, or unlockable characters from the films, players carry a main weapon that can be changed by using weapon boxes. The single pistol has unlimited ammunition. During gameplay, players can find other weapons to replace their main one, and explosives to use as sub-weapons. Characters' stats, including attack damage, weapon uses/ammo, max health, movement speed, and special meter fill rate, are upgraded between stages. As a last resort, players can use their character's special ability once their special meter is full.

Development 
The game was announced on July 30, 2019. Abigail Breslin previewed the game on October 10, 2019.

Reception 
On Metacritic, the PlayStation 4 version of Zombieland: Double Tap – Road Trip received a score of 39% based on five reviews, indicating "generally unfavorable" reviews.

Nintendo Life criticized the game for its short length, gameplay, level design, and price, while praising the presence of Abigail Breslin's voice as Little Rock.

References

External links 
 The game's official website

2019 video games
Windows games
Nintendo Switch games
PlayStation 4 games
Xbox One games
GameMill Entertainment games
High Voltage Software games
Video games developed in the United States
Zombieland (franchise)
Sony Pictures video games
Video games based on films
Shoot 'em ups
Run and gun games
Multiplayer and single-player video games
Cooperative video games
Video games featuring female protagonists
Video games set in the United States
Video games set in amusement parks
Post-apocalyptic video games
Maximum Games games